The Bullenbeisser, also known as the German Bulldog, is an extinct breed of dog known for its strength and agility. The breed was closely related to the Bärenbeisser (some authorities believe that the two breeds were one and the same; the names mean "Bull-biter" and "Bear-biter", respectively, and it is possible they were names for whether the dog was used for bull-baiting or bear-baiting) and was an ancestor to the modern Boxer. It was, in all aspects, similar to the present Alano Español (Spanish Bulldog) and very similar to the Dogo Argentino, not only in aspect, but also in usage. There were two regional varieties, the large Danziger Bullenbeisser and the small Brabanter Bullenbeisser. The breed is now extinct.

Extinction 

The Bullenbeisser ("Bull-biter") became extinct by crossbreeding rather than by a decadence of the breed, as happened with the Old English Bulldog, for instance. The size of the "Bull-biters" varied from about 40 to 70 cm by 1850; the smaller dogs lived in what is today the Netherlands and Belgium, with the larger dogs in Germany. In the late 1870s, German breeders Robert, König and Höpner used the smaller dogs to create a new breed, today called the Boxer, by crossing the smaller Bullenbeissers with Bulldogs brought from Great Britain. The original ancestry was 50/50. However, German owners started crossing their dogs with many Bulldog lineages, which produced an indistinguishable breed after World War II.

See also

Boxer (dog)
Bulldog
Dogo Argentino
Great Dane
List of dog breeds
List of extinct dog breeds
Alano Español

References

External links 
Banter Bulldogge

Extinct dog breeds
Dog breeds originating in Germany
Bulldog_breeds